Rafah DiCostanzo (born May 2, 1962) is a Canadian politician. She was elected to the Nova Scotia House of Assembly in the 2017 provincial election.

Early life and education
DiCostanzo was born in Baghdad, Iraq. She moved to Great Britain as a teenager and arrived in Canada in 1984. She graduated from Mount Saint Vincent University in 1988 with a bachelor of arts in modern languages. She has been an Arabic interpreter with Nova Scotia Interpreting Services since 1990.

Personal life
DiCostanzo is married to John DiCostanzo, a lawyer. Dicostanzo has lived in Clayton Park West for over 33 years.

DiCostanzo worked for Nova Scotia Interpreting Services and also has experience in banking administration, travel constituency, entrepreneurship and business ownership. DiCostanzo speaks five different languages and has worked as an interpreter for new immigrants and refugees for almost 30 years.

Political career
DiCostanzo is a member of the Nova Scotia Liberal Party. First elected in 2017, DiCostanzo became the first Iraqi-Canadian elected to the Nova Scotia House of Assembly. she has represented the electoral district of Clayton Park West since 2017.

DiCostanzo and other community leaders set up a "Stop Littering Committee" in Clayton Park West and challenged other MLAs to help reduce litter and start a conversation about waste management in their rides.

DiCostanzo is currently the Liberal Caucus Chair and vice-Chair of the Community Services Committee, and Chair of the Human Resources Committee, and Chair of the Veterans Affairs Committee, and Chair of the Private and Local Bills Committee, and Chair of the Health Committee, and Vice-Chair of the Natural Resources and Economic Development Committee. DiCostanzo is a member of the Public Accounts, Internal Affairs and Law Amendments Committees. She is also a member of the House of Assembly Management Commission.

DiCostanzo was re-elected in the 2021 provincial election.

Electoral record

References

Interpreters
Iraqi emigrants to Canada
Iraqi emigrants to the United Kingdom
Living people
Mount Saint Vincent University alumni
Nova Scotia Liberal Party MLAs
Politicians from Baghdad
Women MLAs in Nova Scotia
21st-century Canadian politicians
21st-century Canadian women politicians
1962 births
21st-century translators